Ann(e) Roberts may refer to:

Ann Clwyd, married name Roberts, politician
Anne Roberts, journalism teacher and city councillor
Anne C. Roberts, American interventional radiologist
Anne Mason Roberts (1910–1971), American government official
Ann Roberts (umpire), cricket umpire for Australian women's cricket team in England in 2005
Ann Roberts (producer), produced Adopted (film)

See also
Sally-Ann Roberts, TV anchor
Elizabeth Ann Roberts, American model
Roberts (surname)